Huayuan Road Subdistrict may refer to:

Huayuan Road Subdistrict, Beijing
Huayuan Road Subdistrict, Zhengzhou